The 69th district of the Texas House of Representatives contains the entirety of the following Counties: Archer, Baylor, Clay, Cottle, Fisher, Foard, Hardeman, Haskell, King, Knox, Motley, Stonewall, Wichita, and Wilbarger. The current Representative is James Frank, who was first elected in 2012.

References 

69